"A Slip Of the Lip " is 1942 song by Duke Ellington and His Famous Orchestra. The single (Victor 20-1528), sung by Ray Nance and featuring a cornet solo by Nance as well as an alto solo by Johnny Hodges, hit number one on the Harlem Hit Parade for one week. Duke Ellington and his Orchestra made a very similar recording of this song in November 1943 for World Transcriptions.

References

1942 songs